Las Vegas City Hall was the center of municipal government for the City of Las Vegas, Nevada.  It is located downtown, with its main entrance on Stewart Avenue.  It is cited as an example of 1960s modern architecture.  The original eleven-story central tower was completed in 1973.  An addition was completed in 2003 which included a three-story surround to the central tower.  The addition includes additional office space, a parking deck, and a sky bridge to connect the parking deck to the structure.  The addition won the American Institute of Architects Nevada Citation award in 2003.

In November 2010, online retailer Zappos.com announced it would buy and use the building as its new company headquarters.

New Las Vegas City Hall and Zappos Purchase

In 2010, construction for a new city hall building began at a different site and the city government vacated the old building in early 2012.  The building, was occupied in 2013 by Zappos after an extensive renovation.

References

External links 

City of Las Vegas website

Downtown Las Vegas
Buildings and structures in Las Vegas
City halls in Nevada
Government buildings completed in 1973
1970s architecture in the United States
Former seats of local government

de:Las Vegas City Hall
id:Las Vegas City Hall